Sebastián Humberto Viberti Irazoki, nicknamed "El Pelado" (25 May 1944, in Córdoba – 24 November 2012, in Córdoba) was an Argentine footballer and trainer. Known as a former Málaga CF player. He was a father of 3 children, one the football coach Martín Viberti.

References

External links
 
 

1944 births
2012 deaths
Argentine people of Italian descent
Talleres de Córdoba managers
Club Atlético Huracán managers
Argentine footballers
Argentine football managers
Argentine expatriate football managers
Association football midfielders
Footballers from Córdoba, Argentina
Club Atlético Huracán footballers
CD Málaga footballers
Gimnàstic de Tarragona footballers
Club Atlético Belgrano footballers
Argentine expatriate footballers
Expatriate footballers in Spain
Club Atlético Belgrano managers
CD Málaga managers
Expatriate football managers in Spain